Richie Mepranum (born May 5, 1987) is a Filipino professional boxer and current WBO Oriental flyweight champion.

Fighting style
A fine boxer and a skilled counter-puncher, Mepranum is considered one of the Philippines' best kept secrets.

Professional career

Flyweight
Mepranum made his professional debut on August 31, 2005, defeating fellow Filipino boxer Leovimil Florentino by KO in Magpet, Cotabato (del Norte), Philippines.

The Filipino boxer won the WBO Oriental flyweight title on June 14, 2006 against previously unbeaten Joma Funda. The bout was held at the Maasim Gym in Maasim, Sarangani, Philippines; Mepranum won the bout by unanimous decision with the scores of 119-109, 119-109 and 120-108.

Mepranum suffered his first loss on September 14, 2007, against Thai boxer Denkaosan Kaovichit at the Potawattana Saenee School, Ratchaburi, Thailand. Kaovichit won by unanimous decision with the scores of 116-112, 115-113, 116-112. Kaovichit became a world champion a year later, in a bout against Japan's Takefumi Sakata for the WBA World Flyweight title.  He bounced back by defeating Rocky Fuentes by split decision.

On March 12, 2010, Mepranum fought against Mexico's unbeaten Hernan "Tyson" Marquez (27-0; 20 KO) at the Gaylord Hotel in Grapevine, Texas, United States. The Filipino boxer defeated Marquez with an impressive unanimous decision, with the scores of 99-91, 96-94, 98-92.

In June 2010, Mepranum fought for the vacant WBO Flyweight title relinquished by Argentina's Omar Andrés Narváez. The Filipino boxer took on Mexico's Julio César Miranda (31-5-1; 24 KO) on June 12, 2010 at the Convention Center in Puebla, Mexico. Miranda was a veteran fighter with 37 fights and has fought for a world title twice which the Mexican failed to win. Mepranum was defeated by TKO in round 5 and Miranda was crowned WBO flyweight champion. The bout did not start well for Miranda. The Mexican, however, took the pace in the next round, sending Mepranum down twice to the canvas, once in the 4th round and once in the fifth. The referee stopped the fight after the second knockdown, to avoid any more punishment.

Mepranum's next fight was held on November 13, 2010, on the undercard of the Pacquiao vs. Margarito boxing match. His opponent was Anthony Villareal, who lost to Milan Melindo in January 2010. The Sarangani native won the bout by split decision.

References

External links
 

1987 births
Living people
Light-flyweight boxers
Flyweight boxers
People from Sarangani
Southpaw boxers
Filipino male boxers